The Don Beech Scandal was a storyline in the long-running police procedural British television series, The Bill. ITV announced the storyline in 2000, a spokeswoman for The Bill was quoted as saying: "The character of DS Beech has had a huge storyline running over a very long time where he is a corrupt copper. When we first discussed this with Billy we made it clear that one day his character would get his comeuppance, and he agreed to that."

Background
The Don Beech Scandal was one of two major storylines centred on corrupt Detective Sergeant Don Beech. Since the character's debut in 1995, his corruption had steadily grown, taking backhanders from suspects, making deals with dodgy criminals, and getting himself immersed into the underworld of crime. The Scandal played out over three years in the show - beginning with the introduction of DS Claire Stanton in 1999 and Beech's imprisonment in his second major storyline in 2001. The storyline concluded with the whole of CID being suspended, with only four officers being reinstated.

Synopsis
After it was suspected that he had been involved in corrupt criminal activity, unbeknown to Beech, a new Detective Sergeant, Claire Stanton, was placed at Sun Hill. An undercover officer from the Complaints Investigation Bureau, she infiltrated Sun Hill CID to gather evidence and expose Beech's corrupt activities. Beech revealed his activities to fellow officer, DS John Boulton, and offered him a bribe for his help in escaping his superiors. Boulton refused, and in the resulting fight, Beech headbutted Boulton, breaking his nose, and causing him to collapse. Boulton responded by trying to strangle Beech, but Beech slammed his head against the floor, killing him. Nobody suspected Beech of being the killer, and his eventual downfall took place when he entered into a corrupt business relationship with local crime-boss Howard Fallon, which resulted in Beech destroying evidence implicating Fallon, intimidating witnesses and supplying intelligence on the progress of police investigations into Fallon's empire. When his actions began to come to light, Beech fled.

Following Beech's disappearance, CIB under the leadership of Commander Ford (Mark McGann), suspend and interview each member of CID. Duncan Lennox is shocked to discover that Claire Stanton is a CIB mole. Charles Brownlow is informed by Chief Superintendent Guy Mannion (Nick Miles) that he is expected to resign. He refuses at first, but Chief Inspecter Conway makes him realise that he has no choice. Beech attempts to raise as much money as he can, whilst Jack Meadows (Simon Rouse) contacts Commander Campbell from Scotland Yard.

Following the CIB investigation, Ford is satisfied that there was no one else was involved in Beech's corruption, but is unimpressed by the breakdown in supervision, accountability and line management in CID and Chief Superintendent Mannion informs Deakin and Daly that they are to be transferred. Meadows survives at the request of Commander Campbell. DC Holmes requests a transfer. Deakin and Daly are appalled to discover that Meadows has used his connections to save himself, and Deakin tells Meadows "up yours, Jack!". Beech collects a false passport, exchanges a bag of stolen money for some diamonds, and boards a plane to Australia.

Cast upheaval

Executive Producer Richard Handford was responsible for terminating the contracts of eight actors, including Eric Richard (Sgt. Bob Cryer), Ray Ashcroft (DS Geoff Daly), Joy Brook (DC Kerry Holmes), Peter Ellis (Chief Supt. Charles Brownlow) and Shaun Scott (DI Chris Deakin). Russell Boulter
(DS John Boulton) and Billy Murray (DS Don Beech) both left by mutual agreement. Ellis only found out he was leaving when his son, who worked for The Bill as a scriptwriter, informed him. Seven of these characters left as a result of this storyline.

References

The Bill episodes